is an electoral district of the Japanese House of Representatives. the district was created in 1994 as part of the move towards single-member districts, and is currently represented by Constitutional Democratic Party's Yoshinori Suematsu.

Areas Covered

Current District 
As of 16 January 2023, the areas covered by this district are as follows:

 Kodaira
 Kokubunji
 Kunitachi

As part of the 2022 redistricting, Nishitokyo was moved to the 18th district and Kunitachi was returned from the 21st district.

Areas from 2017-2022 
From the second redistricting in 2017 until the third redistricting in 2022, the areas covered by this district were as follows:

 Kodaira
 Kokubunji
 Nishitokyo

As part of the 2017 redistricting, Kunitachi was moved to the 21st district.

Areas fron 2002-2017 
From the first redistricting in 2002 until the second redistricting in 2017, the areas covered by this district were as follows:

 Kodaira
 Kokubunji
 Kunitachi
 Nishitokyo

in 2001, Hōya and Tanashi merged to create the new city of Nishitokyo.

Areas from before 2002 
From the creation of the district in 1994, until the first redistricting in 2002, the areas covered by this district were as follows:

 Kodaira
 Kokubunji
 Kunitachi
 Tanashi
 Hōya

Elected Representatives

Election Results 
‡ - Also ran in the Tokyo PR district

‡‡ - Also ran and won in the Tokyo PR district

References 

Kunitachi, Tokyo
Kodaira, Tokyo
Districts of the House of Representatives (Japan)
Politics of Tokyo